David George Reichert (born August 29, 1950) is an American politician, veteran, and former sheriff who served as the U.S. representative for Washington's 8th congressional district from 2005 to 2019. He is a Republican and is the former elected sheriff of King County, Washington. In September 2017, Reichert announced that he would retire from Congress after his seventh term.

Early life, education, and military career

Reichert was born in Detroit Lakes, Minnesota, the son of Marlys Ann (née Troeger) and George F. Reichert. He is the eldest of seven children and a grandson of the town marshal. His family moved to Washington in 1951, living first in Renton, then later moving to Kent, where he attended Kent Meridian High School. In 1968, he graduated and went to Concordia Lutheran College in Portland, Oregon on a partial football scholarship. He earned an Associate of Arts degree in social work in 1970.

In 1971 he joined the Air Force Reserves' 939th Military Airlift Group. He saw active duty for six months and served until 1976.

Law enforcement career 
Reichert served with the King County sheriff's department beginning in 1972. He was a member of the Green River Task Force, formed to track down the so-called "Green River killer" aided by the infamous Ted Bundy. In 2001, DNA evidence identified Gary Leon Ridgway as the Green River killer.  In 2004, Reichert published the autobiography, Chasing the Devil: My Twenty-Year Quest to Capture the Green River Killer.

In 1971, during his second year in law enforcement, Reichert responded to a domestic violence call in which a knife-wielding man was attempting to kill his wife. During this, Reichert's throat was slit by the attacker, which required stitches and surgery. In an interview, Reichert said of the incident, "I was able to save [the wife], and we got into a scuffle and fell over a coffee table in the living room, and he slit my throat with a butcher knife, ending up with forty-five stitches in my neck." Years later, he was awarded with one of his two Medals of Valor for his bravery.

In 1997, he was appointed sheriff of King County, Washington, by King County executive Ron Sims. In 2001, he ran unopposed for a second four-year term. A widely rebroadcast event during the Seattle World Trade Organization conference and protests showed him chasing demonstrators down 3rd Avenue.

He served as president of the Washington State Sheriffs' Association. He was an executive board member of the Washington Association of Sheriffs and Police Chiefs. In 2004, he won the 2004 National Sheriffs' Association's Sheriff of the Year award, two valor awards, and the Washington State Attorney General's Award for courageous action.

U.S. House of Representatives

Elections

2004 

In 2004, Reichert ran for Congress. In the Republican primary debate, he bowed out, due to other Republican primary candidates not adhering to the so-called Republican 11th commandment.

He defeated his Democratic opponent, KIRO talk show host Dave Ross, in the 2004 Congressional elections, 52% to 47%. He replaced retiring Republican representative Jennifer Dunn. That made Reichert one of just 17 House Republicans elected in a district that also voted for the Democratic candidate for the presidency.

ARMPAC, a political action committee of former House Majority Leader Tom DeLay, donated $20,000 to his election campaign.

2006 

He faced Democratic candidate Darcy Burner in November 2006; he was re-elected with 51% of the vote.

2008 

In a repeat of the 2006 election matchup, he faced Democratic candidate Darcy Burner. He won the general election with 53% of the vote to Darcy Burner's 47%.

2010 

He was challenged by Democratic candidate Suzan DelBene.
 He won re-election with 52% of the vote.

2012 

He was challenged by Democratic candidate Karen Porterfield, and won with almost 60% of the vote.

2014 

He was challenged by Democratic candidate Jason Ritchie, and won with 63% of the vote.

2016 

He was challenged by Democratic candidate and former sportscaster Tony Ventrella, and won with 60% of the vote.

Committee assignments

 Committee on Ways and Means
 Subcommittee on Trade
 Subcommittee on Select Revenue Measures, chair

Caucus memberships
 House Baltic Caucus
Congressional Arts Caucus
Congressional NextGen 9-1-1 Caucus
Climate Solutions Caucus
U.S.-Japan Caucus

Political positions
Reichert was a member of the Republican Main Street Partnership. Reichert was ranked as the 21st most bipartisan member of the U.S. House of Representatives during the 114th United States Congress (and the most bipartisan member of the U.S. House of Representatives from Washington) in the Bipartisan Index created by The Lugar Center and the McCourt School of Public Policy that ranks members of the United States Congress by their degree of bipartisanship (by measuring the frequency each member's bills attract co-sponsors from the opposite party and each member's co-sponsorship of bills by members of the opposite party).

Civil rights
Reichert was one of fifteen Republican House members to vote in favor of repealing "Don't Ask, Don't Tell", the ban on openly gay military service personnel.

In 2017, Reichert declared his support for Executive Order 13769, which imposed a temporary ban on citizens of seven Muslim-majority countries entering the U.S. He stated that "My first and most important job is protecting families in our region and the American people ... We must be absolutely certain we have systems in place capable of thoroughly vetting anyone applying for refugee status on American soil."

Budget, debt, and spending
While he was not present at the vote on the Ryan Budget, he intended to vote for it but was in Washington state for the death of his mother. However, he did vote for the Cut, Cap, and Balance Act and the Budget Control Act of 2011. Both acts required Congress to pass a balanced budget amendment prior to raising the United States debt ceiling. This was supported primarily by Republicans and opposed by Democrats. In the final vote to lift the debt ceiling, until 2013, he voted with the Republican majority in favor.

Crime
Reichert supported reauthorization of the Violence Against Women Act.

He was the main sponsor of the Preventing Sex Trafficking and Improving Opportunities for Youth in Foster Care Act, a bill which would require states to take action to address the problem of sex trafficking of foster care children.

Drug reform
On March 4, 2014, Reichert introduced the Preserving Welfare for Needs Not Weed Act (H.R. 4137; 113th Congress), a bill that would prevent the use of electronic benefit transfer cards in businesses that sell marijuana.

Presidential tax returns 
In February 2017, while serving on the Ways and Means Committee, he voted against a measure that would have led to a request of the Treasury Department for President Donald Trump's tax returns.

Health care
Reichert favored repealing the Affordable Care Act (Obamacare).
Reichert was one of only 20 Republicans to vote against the American Health Care Act of 2017 (also known as Trumpcare).

Taxation
Reichert had signed the Taxpayer Protection Pledge by the Americans for Tax Reform, a group run by Grover Norquist. The pledge commits the signer to oppose any legislation that raises taxes or eliminates tax deductions. On August 1, 2012, he also voted to extend the Bush tax cuts.

On April 10, 2014, Reichert introduced the Permanent S Corporation Built-in Gains Recognition Period Act of 2014 (H.R. 4453; 113th Congress), a bill that would amend the Internal Revenue Code of 1986 to reduce from 10 to 5 years the period during which the built-in gains of an S corporation are subject to tax and to make such reduction permanent.

Personal life
He is married to Julie, whom he met in college. They live in Auburn and have three grown children: Angela, Tabitha, and Daniel, and six grandchildren. He is a member of the Lutheran Church–Missouri Synod.

In 2010, following an injury he sustained from being hit in the head by a tree branch while chopping firewood in his backyard, he developed a subdural hematoma and required emergency surgery.

Electoral history

References

External links

Visit Dave Reichert's Website 

 
 Capture of The Green River Killer Mini-Series
 

|-

|-

1950 births
21st-century American politicians
American Lutherans
Concordia University (Oregon) alumni
Living people
Military personnel from Minnesota
Military personnel from Washington (state)
People from Auburn, Washington
People from Detroit Lakes, Minnesota
People from Kent, Washington
People from Renton, Washington
Republican Party members of the United States House of Representatives from Washington (state)
Washington (state) sheriffs